The 2010–11 Basketball League of Serbia B is the 5th season of the Basketball League of Serbia B, the second professional basketball league in Serbia. The 182-game regular season (26 games for each of the 14 teams) began on Saturday, October 2, 2010, and will end on Sunday, April 17, 2011.

Teams

Promotion and relegation 
Promoted to Basketball League of Serbia B
 BKK Radnički
 Niš
 Spartak
 KG Student

Relegated to Serbian First League
 Jug
 Vrbas
 Zdravlje
 Beovuk 72

Venues and locations

Regular season

P=Matches played, W=Matches won, L=Matches lost, F=Points for, A=Points against, D=Points difference, Pts=Points

Source: SrbijaSport

External links
 Official website

Second Basketball League of Serbia
B
Serbia